Celebrity Splash! (also known as Splash!) is a reality television franchise created by Dutch company Eyeworks, started from their Dutch reality show Sterren Springen Op Zaterdag which premièred in 2012. The franchise involves celebrities diving into the pool.

Format

Origins and history
Splash has its origin and idea from German Olympic-themed variety TV show TV total Turmspringen (TV total Diving), it was first aired on 16 December 2004, in the TV total show, on ProSieben and was founded by Stefan Raab and hosted by Sonya Kraus. Other hosts/reporters include Ingolf Lück (2004), Kai Pflaume (2005), Oliver Welke and Matthias Opdenhövel (2007, 09), Steven Gätjen (2011–12) and Olaf Schubert (2011–12 reporter).

It has been held every year since, with the exception of 2006. The eighth competition was on 24 November 2012 re-fought at the Olympic Pool, Munich.

The idea for the German show has been adopted by US network FOX and aired as a two-hour special, renamed Stars in Danger: The High Dive, on 9 January 2013. Fox's rival show is the American version of Splash, which airs on ABC since March 2013.

Both shows are similar in concept to the Netherlands-born Splash reality show format, which launched in August 2012 and is now produced in at least 10 other countries.

Versions
: Currently airing franchise
 Franchise with an upcoming season
 Franchise no longer in production

Controversy
In 2012, French-based production group Banijay International requested an injunction against Dutch group Eyeworks, claiming the show is a copy of the older German format, TV Total Turmspringen, created by Banijay subsidiary Brainpool TV.

References

External links 
 Celebrity Splash! at Eyeworks

Reality television series franchises
Celebrity reality television series